Bob Stone (1930–1996) was an American professional golfer.

Stone played on the PGA Tour and Senior PGA Tour and worked as a club professional. 

Stone played on the PGA Tour from 1968 to 1972 with a best finish of tied for second behind Dale Douglass at the 1969 Azalea Open Invitational. He played on the Senior PGA Tour from 1981 to 1987 with three second place finishes. In the 1981 U.S. Senior Open, Stone finished tied with Arnold Palmer and Billy Casper, but lost the resultant playoff to Palmer. He also finished second to Don January at the 1983 Citizens Union Senior Golf Classic and to Billy Casper at the 1984 Senior PGA Tour Roundup.

Stone was inducted into the Kansas City Golf Association Hall of Fame in 2014.

Professional wins
This list is incomplete.
1958 Iowa Open
1959 Iowa Open
1960 Nebraska Open
1962 Iowa Open, Kansas Open
1963 Kansas Open, Nebraska Open
1966 Nebraska Open
1969 Midwest PGA Championship
1970 Florida Citrus Open Invitational (PGA Tour satellite event)
1975 Midwest PGA Championship, Missouri Open
1976 Midwest PGA Championship
1979 Midwest PGA Championship
1982 Midwest PGA Championship

Playoff record
Senior PGA Tour playoff record (0–1)

References

External links

American male golfers
PGA Tour golfers
PGA Tour Champions golfers
1930 births
1996 deaths